is a public park in Naka Ward, Yokohama, Japan, famous for its waterfront views of the Port of Yokohama.

History 
Much of Yokohama was destroyed on September 1, 1923, by the Great Kantō earthquake. A Scotsman, Marshall Martin, advisor to Mayor Ariyoshi Chuichi, is credited with persuading the city government to use rubble from the Kannai commercial district to reclaim the former waterfront as a park.

Yamashita Park was formally opened on March 15, 1930.

The park was requisitioned in 1945 during the Occupation of Japan for military housing, reverting to Japanese control in 1960.  Across the street from the park is the Hotel New Grand where General Douglas MacArthur spent his first night on his arrival in Japan on August 30, 1945.

Park attractions
As well as public green space with trees, flower beds, fountains and memorials, Yamashita Park is also noted as the location of:

 The Ōsanbashi Pier, a pier on which is built the Yokohama passenger ship terminal, which has been in continuous operation since 1896, with major renovations in 1964 and 2002.
 The Hikawa Maru, a Japanese ocean liner built in 1929 for Nippon Yūsen Kabushiki Kaisha ("NYK Line") now a museum ship.
 The Port Service, an operator of seabuses, excursion and restaurant ships, operating from the park pier. Ship services include scheduled public lines as far as Yokohama Station as well as larger charter ships.
 The Guardian of Water, a Donal Hord sculpture gifted by Yokohama's sister city San Diego in 1960. A replica of the sculpture located in front of the San Diego County Administration Center.
 Yokohama Indian Water Fountain. Donated by the local Indian community to show its gratitude to the Japanese for aiding the Indian survivors after the 1923 Great Kantō earthquake, as well as to remember those who perished in the disaster.
 Girl Scout Statue - Dedicated March 18, 1962 on the Fiftieth Anniversary of the founding of the Girl Scouts. (two of the three models for the statue are Libby Watson and Hiroko Tanaka)
 Statue of the Girl with Red Shoes (Akai Kutsu)
 Monument of the Children's Song "Seagull Sailor Man"
 Monument of General Artemio Ricarte - Philippine General, erected in 1972

References

Naka-ku, Yokohama
Parks and gardens in Yokohama
Tourist attractions in Yokohama